The Return may refer to:

Print media
 Nostoi or Returns, a lost poem in ancient Greek, thought to have been completed in the sixth or seventh century BC
The Return, a 1987 children book by Sonia Levitin  
 The Return (de la Mare novel), a 1910 novel by Walter de la Mare
 "The Return" (short story), a 1954/1960 short story by H. Beam Piper
 The Return (Conrad short story), an 1898 short story by Joseph Conrad
 The Return (Paulsen novel), a 1991 novel by Gary Paulsen, also known as The River
 The Return (short story collection), a short story collection by Roberto Bolaño
 The Return (Shatner novel), a 1997 Star Trek novel by William Shatner
 The Return (Animorphs), the forty-eighth book in the Animorphs series by K.A. Applegate
 The Return (Aldrin and Barnes novel), a 2000 novel by Buzz Aldrin and John Barnes
 The Return (Nesser novel), a 1995 novel by Håkan Nesser
 The Return (memoir), by Hisham Matar
 "The Return" (play), an Australian play by Reg Cribb

Films
 The Return (1916 film), starring William S. Hooser
 The Return (1921 film), a silent British film by Fred Paul
 The Return (1979 film), a 1979 Yugoslav film
 The Return (1980 film), a 1980 American science fiction film starring Jan-Michael Vincent and Cybill Shepherd
 Nostos: The Return, a 1989 Italian film
 The Return (2003 film) (Vozvrashcheniye), a 2003 Russian drama film
 The Return, a 2003 British television film starring Julie Walters
 The Return (2006 film), a 2006 American psychological horror film starring Sarah Michelle Gellar
 The Return, also known as The Lucky Ones, a 2008 film directed by Neil Burger and starring Rachel McAdams, Tim Robbins and Michael Peña
 The Return (2013 film), a Venezuelan film

Television 
 Twin Peaks: The Return, a 2017 limited series continuing the events of the 1990–1991 television series Twin Peaks
 The Returned, English title of Les Revenants, a 2012 French supernatural TV series
 "The Return" (Arrow), an episode of Arrow
 "The Return" (Stargate Atlantis), a two-part episode of Stargate Atlantis
 The Return (The Office), a 2007 episode of The Office
 "The Return", an episode of the TV series Dilbert
 "The Return", an episode of the animated television series Ben 10
 "The Return" (Justice League Unlimited episode), an episode of Justice League Unlimited
 The Return (Once Upon a Time),an episode of the American television series Once Upon a Time
 "The Return", the third episode of the 1966 Doctor Who serial The Ark
 The Return, the working title for the 1984 Doctor Who serial Resurrection of the Daleks
 "The Return" (The Vampire Diaries), an episode of the TV series The Vampire Diaries
 "The Return" (Homeland), an episode of the TV series Homeland

Music
 The Return……, a 1985 album by Bathory
 The Return (Pat Martino album), 1987
 The Return (Pharao album), 1998
 The Return (Ruben Studdard album), 2006
 The Return (Vanilla Fudge album), 2002
 The Return (Shinhwa album), 2012
 The Return (Nonpoint album), 2014
 The Return (Kamaal Williams album), 2018
 The Return, a 1995 album by Melodie MC
 The Return, a 2011 album by Machel Montano
 The Return, a 2012 album by actress and singer Lauryn Hill
 "The Return", a song by Danny Brown from his 2013 album Old
 "The Return", a song by Killswitch Engage from their self-titled 2009 album

Other uses
 The Return (guerrilla organization), or al-Awda, an Iraqi guerilla organization
 The Return (American football), another name for the 2021 Tampa Bay Buccaneers–New England Patriots game

See also
 Return (disambiguation)
 Returns (disambiguation)
 The Returned (2013 film), a Spanish-Canadian thriller